Himalaphantes is a genus of Asian dwarf spiders that was first described by A. V. Tanasevitch in 1992.

Species
 it contains fourteen species, found in China, India, Japan, Nepal, and Russia:
Himalaphantes aduncus Irfan, Zhang & Peng, 2022 – China
Himalaphantes arcuatus Zhang, Liu, Irfan & Peng, 2022 – China
Himalaphantes auriculus Irfan, Zhang & Peng, 2022 – China
Himalaphantes azumiensis (Oi, 1979) – Russia (Far East), China, Japan
Himalaphantes fugongensis Irfan, Zhang & Peng, 2022 – China
Himalaphantes grandiculus (Tanasevitch, 1987) (type) – Nepal
Himalaphantes gyratus Irfan, Zhang & Peng, 2022 – China
Himalaphantes lingulatus Zhang, Liu, Irfan & Peng, 2022 – China
Himalaphantes magnus (Tanasevitch, 1987) – Nepal
Himalaphantes martensi (Thaler, 1987) – India (Kashmir), Nepal
Himalaphantes pseudoaduncus Irfan, Zhang & Peng, 2022 – China
Himalaphantes pulae Irfan, Zhang & Peng, 2022 – China
Himalaphantes uncatus Zhang, Liu, Irfan & Peng, 2022 – China
Himalaphantes zhangmuensis (Hu, 2001) – China

See also
 List of Linyphiidae species (A–H)

References

Araneomorphae genera
Linyphiidae
Spiders of Asia